Stenalia sefrensis is a beetle in the genus Stenalia of the family Mordellidae. It was described in 1924 by Chobaut.

References

sefrensis
Beetles described in 1924